Vosila is an extinct genus of flies in the family Vosilidae. There is one described species in Vosila, V. sinensis. found in the Callovian aged Daohugou Bed, Inner Mongolia, China

References

Tachinidae
Monotypic Brachycera genera
Articles created by Qbugbot